The 2021 Super Rugby season was the 26th season of Super Rugby, an annual men's international rugby union tournament organised by SANZAAR, involving teams from Australia and New Zealand. Due to the COVID-19 pandemic the tournament was wholly regionalised, with the 2021 Super Rugby Aotearoa season and the 2021 Super Rugby AU season replacing the previous 15 side format used from 2018 till 2020. Super Rugby Trans-Tasman followed these tournaments, a crossover competition that featured the five Australian sides playing the five New Zealand sides.

Competition format 

The five New Zealand sides competed in the 2nd Super Rugby Aotearoa season, while the four Australian sides, plus the addition again of the Western Force, competed in the 2nd Super Rugby AU season. The competition did not feature any South African sides who announced their withdrawal from Super Rugby in September 2020, while the Japanese side, the Sunwolves, was confirmed as leaving the league in March 2019. The Argentinian side, the Jaguares, were also not named in any competition and did not compete in 2021. Following the draw for the 2021 Super Rugby AU season, Rugby Australia confirmed they were working with New Zealand Rugby on a trans-Tasman competition to follow the Super Rugby Aotearoa and Super Rugby AU seasons. On 13 November, this tournament was confirmed as Super Rugby Trans-Tasman, which featured the Australian and New Zealand sides playing each other in 25 crossover matches before a final. All sides played two home matches, and two away matches as well as a 'Super Round' where all matches will be played in one location over the course of one weekend. The final was then held between the top two teams in the combined competition table.

Law variations 

Both Super Rugby AU and Super Rugby Aotearoa saw law changes again for 2021. Super Rugby AU saw changes to kick-offs and restarts, with a free kick awarded if a kickoff has not taken place 30 seconds following the opposition scoring, a restart is kicked out on the full or if teammates of the kicker are not behind the ball. The free kick will take place at half way. These rules are similar to those that are currently used in Rugby sevens. Also the 'Golden point' law brought in during the 2020 season is tweaked so that full-time will only occur after a try is scored, rather than any form of points. Penalties and drop goals will still count towards the score during extra time, but will not end the game, with play only ending if a try is scored or the 10-minute extra time period ends.

Super Rugby Aotearoa saw the introduction of Goal-line drop outs, brought in for when an attacking player is held up or knocks the ball on in goal. When a kick is forced in goal by the defending team then a goal-line drop out will also take place. These rules were used successfully in the Australian 2020 Super Rugby AU season. Extra time was also used again in 2021, again consisting of a 10-minute period, however differing from the 2021 Super Rugby AU season, the team scoring the first points of any kind in this period will win the match. A captain's referral was also brought in for 2021, similar to those used successfully in cricket and tennis, with New Zealand Rugby becoming the first to trial it in rugby union. Each team is allowed one referral per match which can be used in one of three scenarios: a decision occurring in the final five minutes of a match, an offence in the build up to a try being scored or an act of foul play. All other law variations from the 2020 season were again used in both Super Rugby competitions in the 2021 season.

Future developments 

In the longer term, a new 12-team tournament from 2022 onwards was mooted, with the current four Australian and five New Zealand sides, plus the full time return of the Australian side the Western Force to Super Rugby, following their departure from the competition at the end of the 2017 Super Rugby season. It was suggested they be joined in the competition by teams from the Pacific Islands and Fiji, with South African sides having confirmed their departure from Super Rugby to join an expanded Pro14 competition, and no place for the Argentinian Jaguares either. On 13 November, New Zealand Rugby confirmed Fiji Rugby and Moana Pasifika as its preferred partners for Super Rugby going forward. A Hawaiian side had been mooted to join the competition, with Kanaloa Pasifika having gone through the process to try and join the competition, however they were not selected by New Zealand Rugby. Kanaloa Pasifika launched legal action over this decision, stating that Moana Pasifika had not gone through the correct process to join the competition.

On 24 February 2021, the Fiji Rugby Union announced it had completed its business plan for the entry of Fijian Drua to Super Rugby in 2022 and submitted it to the New Zealand Rugby Union. The plan outlines financial targets, initial playing squad and coaching structure as well as outlining the complete administrative structures for the team. The team will be a separate entity from the Fijian Rugby Union, similar to that of the Drua's entry into the Australian National Rugby Championship in 2017. The team is still required to meet stringent financial conditions set by the New Zealand Rugby Union, and so was seeking NZ$10 million in private investment to allow the team to join in 2022. Further steps were announced on both sides joining the competition in March 2021, with New Zealand Rugby Union agreeing to a sharing of broadcasting revenue with both potential sides. On 24 March 2021, World Rugby announced financial, high performance and administrative support for both potential new franchises, in order to boost the performances of Pacific Islands at international level, while also being able to stay local instead of heading overseas.

On 14 April 2021, both the Fijian Drua and Moana Pasifika were granted conditional licenses to join Super Rugby in 2022 by the New Zealand Rugby Union. They will join the existing five New Zealand Super Rugby sides, plus the existing four Australian sides along with the Western Force who will return to the competition full-time having taken part in both editions of Super Rugby AU and Super Rugby Trans-Tasman.

On 12 July 2021, Moana Pasifika were granted an unconditional licence, confirming them for the 2022 Super Rugby season.

Players

Squads

The following 2021 Super Rugby squads have been named. Players listed in italics denote non-original squad members.

Referees
The following referees were selected to officiate the 2021 Super Rugby season:

See also

 Super Rugby Aotearoa
 Super Rugby AU
Super Rugby Trans-Tasman

References

External links
 Super Rugby websites:
 Official Super Rugby website
 Australia Super Rugby website
 New Zealand Super Rugby website

 
2021
Super Rugby
Super Rugby
Super Rugby